Marie Adam-Doerrer (23 March 1838 – 29 July 1908) was a Swiss women's rights activist and unionist.

Born in Germany as Marie Doerrer, she trained as a goldsmith and worked in Bern as a washerwoman, marrying the shoemaker Karl Adam. She joined the Social Democratic Party of Switzerland after losing her savings in a bank crash. In 1887, she co-founded the Bernese Women Workers' Association (Arbeiterinnenverein), and 1902, the Bernese Women Day Laborers' Association (Tagelöhnerinnenverein), which she presided over.

Adam-Doerrer was a co-founder and member of numerous other Swiss women's organizations, and advocated in favor of cooperation between socialist and conservative women's organizations at the 1904 international women's congress.

References

1838 births
1908 deaths
Swiss socialist feminists
Swiss women's rights activists
19th-century Swiss people
20th-century Swiss people
19th-century Swiss women
20th-century Swiss women